The women's high jump event at the 2006 African Championships in Athletics was held at the Stade Germain Comarmond on August 11.

Results

References
Results 
Results

2006 African Championships in Athletics
High jump at the African Championships in Athletics
2006 in women's athletics